Ang Mahiwagang Baul is a Philippine television drama fantasy anthology broadcast by GMA Network. Starring Eissen Bayubay, Sandy Talag and Carme Sanchez, it premiered on July 17, 2005. The show concluded on January 28, 2007 with a total of 74 episodes.

The show features retelling popular Philippine myths, legends and folktales. It was originally slated for seven episodes, was later extended due to viewership ratings and feedback from the viewers. Some episodes were released on DVD by GMA Records and Home Videos in 2007 in three volumes. The series is streaming online on YouTube.

Cast and characters
Main cast
 Eisen Bayubay as Epoy
 Sandy Talag as Jewel
 Carme Sanchez as Lola Tasya
 John Feir as Rextor

Recurring cast
 Shamaine Centenera as Lourdes
 Nonie Buencamino as Emil
 Bella Flores as Lola Gelay
 Patricia Ysmael as Yayang
 Marian Rivera as Rahinda

Accolades

References

External links
 

2005 Philippine television series debuts
2007 Philippine television series endings
Filipino-language television shows
GMA Network original programming
Philippine anthology television series